Umeki Webb (born June 26, 1975) is a former professional basketball player in the Women's National Basketball Association (WNBA).

Webb started her professional career playing for Phoenix Mercury before playing for the Miami Sols.

NC State statistics
Source

References

External links
Sol's Umeki Webb Wants To Show She Can Do More Than `Just Play Defense.' - tribunedigital-sunsentinel

1975 births
Living people
American women's basketball players
Basketball players at the 1999 Pan American Games
Basketball players from Dallas
Guards (basketball)
Forwards (basketball)
Miami Sol players
NC State Wolfpack women's basketball players
Pan American Games gold medalists for the United States
Pan American Games medalists in basketball
Phoenix Mercury draft picks
Phoenix Mercury players
Medalists at the 1999 Pan American Games